Axel may refer to:

People
 Axel (name), all persons with the name

Places
 Axel, Netherlands, a town
 Capture of Axel, a battle at Axel in 1586

Arts, entertainment, media
 Axel, a 1988 short film by Nigel Wingrove
 Axel, a Cirque du Soleil show
 Axël, an 1890 drama play by Auguste Villiers de l'Isle-Adam
 Axel (dance turn), a type of turn performed in dance
 Axel lift, a movement in pair skating
 Axel jump, a type of jump in figure skating
 "Axel F", the 1985 instrumental theme song of Beverly Hills Cop by Harold Faltermeyer

Companies, organizations
 Axel Hotels, hotel chain
 Axel Springer SE, largest digital publishing house in Europe

Other uses
 Axel Maersk, Danish container ship
 Citroën Axel, automobile made by Citroën
 Typhoon Axel (disambiguation), multiple storms named Axel

See also
 Aksel
 Axl (disambiguation)
 Axle, a central shaft for a rotating wheel or gear

es:Axel
hu:Axel